Dolphin Cove is an American drama television series created by Allan Marcil, set in Queensland, Australia that aired on CBS from January 21 to March 11, 1989 for eight episodes.

Synopsis
The show centers on widowed researcher Michael Larson (Frank Converse) and his two teenage children: daughter Katie (Karron Graves), and her elder brother David (Trey Ames). The Larsons move to Australia, after Michael is hired by wealthy industrialist Baron Trent to help perfect man-to-dolphin communications. To this end, Michael begins working with two dolphins named Slim and Delbert.

Michael's wife died in an automobile accident roughly a year ago. David does his best to fit in with the Aussie lifestyle, and at his new school, but finds it tricky. Katie, who was in the car with her mother during the fatal crash, was not injured physically but has been an elective mute (capable of speaking but refusing) ever since. Initially, Katie distrusts her new therapist, Alison Mitchell. Although Katie is not comfortable around most people, she promptly hits it off with Slim and Delbert. Moreover, Katie soon discovers that she has a telepathic means of communicating with both dolphins; thus she succeeds where her father and Trent have failed.

Also working for Trent is Didge, an Aboriginal Australian. Didge acts as Michael's assistant, besides being a mentor and (when called for) bodyguard to David and Katie.

Kevin Mitchell, Alison's son, is one of David's classmates and frequently coaches David through life at their school.

The series, filmed on location at Seaworld on Australia's Gold Coast, was co-created by Peter Benchley.

Cast
Frank Converse – Michael Larson
Trey Ames – David Larson
Karron Graves – Katie Larson
Ernie Dingo – Didge
Virginia Hey – Alison Mitchell
Antony Richards – Kevin Mitchell
Nick Tate – Baron Trent

Episodes

References

External links
 
 NY Times

1989 American television series debuts
1989 American television series endings
English-language television shows
CBS original programming
Fictional dolphins
Television series about mammals
Television shows set in Queensland
Television series by CBS Studios